Albertus Bernardus Erasmus (born ) is a South African rugby union player who last played for the  in the Currie Cup. His regular position is flank.

References

1995 births
Living people
Free State Cheetahs players
Rugby union flankers
Rugby union players from Pretoria
South African rugby union players